Scrobipalpa intima is a moth in the family Gelechiidae. It was described by Povolný in 2001. It is found in China (Hebei) and Russia (Chitinskaya oblast).

References

Scrobipalpa
Moths described in 2001